Bandwan Assembly constituency is an assembly constituency in Purulia district in the Indian state of West Bengal. It is reserved for scheduled tribes.

Overview
As per orders of the Delimitation Commission, No. 238 Bandwan Assembly constituency (ST) is composed of the following: Bandwan, Barabazar and Manbazar II community development blocks.

Bandwan Assembly constituency (ST) is part of No. 33 Jhargram (Lok Sabha constituency) (ST).

Members of Legislative Assembly

Election results

2021
Rajib Lochan Saren of AITC won the election in 2021 defeating the  runner up candidate Parcy Murmu of BJP.

2016
Rajib Lochan Saren (AITC) won the election in 2016 defeating the  runner up candidate Susanta Besra(CPM ).

2011
In the 2011 elections, Susanta Besra of CPI(M) defeated his nearest rival Sital Chandra Hembram of Congress.

.# Congress did not contest this seat in 2006.

1977-2006
In the 2006 and 2001 state assembly elections, Upendra Nath Hansda of CPI(M) won the Bandwan (ST) assembly seat, defeating his nearest rivals Kamala Kanta Mandi of BJP and Birsing Murmu of JMM respectively. Contests in most years were multi cornered but only winners and runners are being mentioned. Lakhiram Kisku of CPI(M) defeated Sital Chandra Hembram of Congress in 1996, Birsing Murmu of JMM in 1991 and Ramprasad Hansda of Congress in 1987. Sudhansu Sekhar Majhi of CPI(M) defeated Panchanan Soren, Independent, in 1982, and Budheswar Majhi of Congress in 1977.

1962-1972
Sital Chandra Hembram of Congress won in 1972 and 1971. Budheswar Majhi of Congress won in 1969. Kandru Majhi, Independent/ Lok Sewak Sangh, won in 1967 and 1962.  Prior to that the Bandwan seat was not there.

References

Assembly constituencies of West Bengal
Politics of Purulia district